The Jeep Cherokee is a line of SUVs manufactured and marketed by Jeep over five generations. Originally marketed as a variant of the Jeep Wagoneer, the Cherokee has evolved from a full-size SUV to one of the first compact SUVs and into its current generation as a crossover SUV. Named after the Cherokee tribe of North American Indians, Jeep has used the nameplate in some capacity since 1974.

First generation (SJ; 1974)

The Cherokee was a rebadged reintroduction of a two-door body style Jeep Wagoneer, with a redesigned greenhouse that eliminated the car's C-pillar. Instead the Cherokee sported a much wider D-pillar and a single, long fixed rear side window with an optional flip-out section. Previously, a two-door version had been available in the Jeep Wagoneer line (from 1963 to 1967), although this had the same pillar and window configuration as the four-door Wagoneer. The Cherokee replaced the Jeepster Commando, whose sales had not met expectations despite an extensive 1972 revamp. The Cherokee appealed to a younger market than the Wagoneer, which was regarded more as a family SUV.

The Cherokee was marketed as the "sporty" two-door variant of Jeep's station wagon that went beyond the CJ-5 in room with off-road ability. The term "sport(s) utility vehicle" appears for the first time in the 1974 Cherokee sales brochure. A four-door was not added to the lineup until 1977. Other than the base model, the trim levels of the Cherokee included the S (Sport), Chief, Golden Eagle, Golden Hawk, Limited, Classic, Sport, Pioneer, and Laredo.

Second generation (XJ; 1984)

While the Wagoneer continued in production for another eight years as the Grand Wagoneer, the Cherokee nameplate was moved to a new platform for 1984. Without a traditional body-on-frame chassis, the Cherokee instead featured a light-weight unibody design.

This generation Cherokee would eventually be well-known as an innovator of the modern SUV, as it spawned competitors as other automakers began to notice that this Jeep design began replacing regular cars. It also began to supplant the role of the station wagon and "transformed from truck to limousine in the eyes of countless suburban owners." The XJ is a "significant link in the evolution of the 4x4."

It would prove to be so popular that the second generation Cherokee's replacement was released as a separate vehicle altogether as the Jeep Grand Cherokee, itself starting a successive line of vehicles as Jeep's flagship vehicle.

Third generation (KJ; 2002)

The third generation, marketed as the Jeep Liberty in North America to differentiate it from the Grand Cherokee, was introduced in April 2001 for the 2002 model year. It was sold as the Jeep Cherokee in markets outside of North America.

The Cherokee was priced between the Wrangler and Grand Cherokee. It remained the smallest of the 4-door Jeep SUVs up until the crossover-based 4-door Compass and Patriot arrived for 2007. The Cherokee featured unibody-construction. It was assembled at the Toledo North Assembly Plant in the United States, as well as in other countries including Egypt and Venezuela.

It was the first Jeep vehicle to use rack and pinion steering. It was also the first Jeep to use the two then-new PowerTech engines; the  2.4 L straight-4, which was discontinued in 2006, and the  3.7 L V6. However, the Cherokee was not the first Jeep vehicle to use an independent front suspension, as the Wagoneer first used it in the 1963 model. But, that independent front suspension was limited to four wheel drive versions and, even then, was a short lived option.

Fourth generation (KK; 2008)

Still using the Jeep Liberty name in North America, the Cherokee was redesigned in 2008. For the first time, a rebadged version of a Jeep model existed, as Dodge sold this version of the Cherokee as the Dodge Nitro during the same time period as the fourth-generation Cherokee. It was eventually discontinued both due to slow sales as well as Sergio Marchionne wanting to avoid duplicated vehicles with Dodge and Jeep (as well as Chrysler) sharing the same sales network.

With the smaller Patriot and Compass now available to cater to MPG-conscious buyers, the four-cylinder engine was dropped from the Cherokee's offerings. The iron-block, aluminium-head V6 was the only engine available for 2008. Jeep discontinued the Cherokee's CRD for the American market because it couldn't meet tougher 2007 emissions standards for diesel engines. Transmission choices were both carry-overs: a six-speed manual or a four-speed automatic. Standard equipment included electronic stability control with roll mitigation, traction control, and anti-lock brakes with brake assist. New Features included standard side airbags. Optional features are rain-sensing wipers, Sirius Satellite Radio, Bluetooth, a navigation system, and the MyGig entertainment system, complete with a 30GB hard drive.

Fifth generation (KL; 2014)

For the fifth generation, the Cherokee nameplate returned to North America as the vehicle was converted to a crossover and grew to midsize in order to make room for the Jeep Renegade below the Cherokee and Compass. It was introduced for the 2014 model year at the 2013 New York International Auto Show and the sales started in November 2013. The Cherokee is the first Jeep vehicle to be built on the Fiat Compact/Compact U.S. Wide platform, co-developed by Chrysler and Fiat. The Jeep Cherokee was assembled at Belvidere Assembly Plant in Belvidere, Illinois until February 28, 2023.

In 2018 the front end was updated and a new 2.0-litre turbo engine became available, with 270 hp and 295 lb.ft. of torque, complementing the 3.2-litre V-6 and 2.4-litre inline-four.

For the 2021 model year, Jeep added more standard comfort and convenience features on each trim, as well as introduced the Latitude Lux and related 80th Anniversary trims.

On February 28 2023 the last Jeep Cherokee rolled off the line of the Belvidere Assembly Plant.

Calls to change the name
In February 2021, Chuck Hoskin, Jr., principal chief of the Cherokee Nation called for Jeep to change the name of the vehicle. "I think we're in a day and age in this country where it's time for both corporations and team sports to retire the use of Native American names, images and mascots from their products, team jerseys and sports in general." "I'm sure this comes from a place that is well-intended, but it does not honor us by having our name plastered on the side of a car." "The best way to honor us is to learn about our sovereign government, our role in this country, our history, culture, and language and have meaningful dialogue with federally recognized tribes on cultural appropriateness."

Notes

References

Cherokee
All-wheel-drive vehicles
Motor vehicles manufactured in the United States
Anti-indigenous racism in the United States